The second season of Idol Puerto Rico premiered on July 29, 2012, and will end on November 12, 2012. Like the previous season, it is hosted by Jaime Augusto Mayol. The victory went to Gremal Maldonado., Its origin is Dominican-Puerto Rican.

Selection process

Auditions
The show selected contestants from two auditions held on April 28, 2012, in the Juan Pachín Vicéns Auditorium at Ponce and May 5, 2012, in the Hiram Bithorn Stadium at San Juan; those auditions were presented on July 29–31, 2012. As part of the premiere, WAPA TV presented a primetime special.

Theater level
During the "Theater Level" auditions, the selected contestants sang individually in front of the judges. They were then evaluated in groups to gradually reduce the number. The jury listened each pair and eliminated several contestants. In the end, the judges chose the twenty-four semifinalists.

Semi-finals
The semi-finals featured a total of 24 contestants. After the semi-finals, 12 of the contestants were eliminated, leaving the remaining 12 for the Finals.

Females
 Alpha Berrios, 16, Toa Baja 
 Aivelyn Diaz, 26, Toa Baja 
 Celimar Lopes, 17, Salinas 
 Fabiola Ramos, 25, Ponce 
 Genesis Ramirez, 19, San Juan 
 Gremal Maldonado, 17, Salinas
 Ivelisse Fermin, 26, Trujilo Alto 
 Karla Arroyo, 16, Juana Diaz 
 Kelly Romero, 18, Gurabo 
 Leslie Crespo, 26, San Juan 
 Tania Roman, 27, Carolina 
 Xenia Rivera, 21, Gurabo

Males
 Abimelec Torres, 23, San Sebastian 
 Alex Rosado, 20, Vega Alta 
 Angel Rodriguez, 25, Cayey 
 Carlos Jimenez, 26, Carozal 
 Carlos Valls, 23, San Juan 
 Ismael Estepa, 21, Bayamon 
 Jonathan Echevarria, 21, Rio Grande 
 Juan Aviles, 26, Coamo 
 Micheal Rivera, 27, Humacao 
 Pablo Nieves, 21, Guayanabo 
 Roberto Escobar, 21, Ponce

Finalists

Finals
The finals began on September 3, 2012, with 12 contestants and are scheduled to end on November 12, 2012. One finalist was eliminated per week based on the public's votes.

First Gala: September 3, 2012
During the first gala, contestants performed a variety of pop songs from various Latin artists.

 Group performance: "Tu piano y mi guitarra" (Ricardo Montaner)

Second Gala: September 10, 2012
Guest performer: Prince Royce

During the second gala, contestants performed songs from several Latin pop singers.

Third Gala: September 17, 2012
The third gala had the contestants performing songs from various tropical genres like Salsa, merengue, and others.

Fourth Gala: September 24, 2012
The fourth gala featured songs within the Latin rock (or Rock en Español) genre. Also, it was announced that contestant Roberto Escobar had been disqualified from the competition for inappropriate conduct.

Fifth Gala: October 1, 2012
The fifth gala was titled "Top of the Charts Night" and it featured interpretations of songs that topped the US charts at some time.

Sixth Gala: October 8, 2012
Guest performer: Daddy Yankee

The sixth gala featured a guest performance from Daddy Yankee, who performed his new hit "Pasarela".

Seventh Gala: October 15, 2012
Guest judge: Kany García

The seventh gala was dubbed "Acoustic Night", and each contestant performed two songs. Also, Ricardo Montaner couldn't serve as judge, and singer Kany García served as guest judge for the night.

Eight Gala: October 22, 2012
The eight gala was dedicated to judges Ricardo Montaner and Yolandita Monge. Each of the four remaining contestants performed two songs from them, with the males singing Montaner's songs and the females singing from Monge's repertoire.

Ninth Gala: October 29, 2012
 Guest artist: Gilberto Santa Rosa

Tenth Gala: November 5, 2012
 Guest artist: Tommy Torres

The ninth gala was the last one before the final. No participant was eliminated from the competition during the gala. Gremal and Juan Carlos sang two unreleased songs and one in honor of the guest judge, Tommy Torres.

Final Gala: November 12, 2012
 Guest artist: Carlos Vives, Elvis Crespo, Erika Ender, Christian Pagán, Kany García, Yolandita Monge and Ricardo Montaner

 Group performance: "Tu piano y mi guitarra" (Ricardo Montaner), "Sigo Caminando" with Erika Ender.

Elimination chart

: Roberto Escobar had been disqualified from the competition for inappropriate conduct.
: No participant was eliminated from the competition during the gala. Gremal and Juan Carlos sang two unreleased songs and one in honor of the guest judge, Tommy Torres.

References

External links
Official website

2012 American television seasons
Idols (franchise)